Arthur Batchelar (11 March 1831 – 6 January 1912) was an English cricketer. He played two first-class matches for Surrey in 1862.

See also
 List of Surrey County Cricket Club players

References

External links
 

1831 births
1912 deaths
English cricketers
Surrey cricketers
Cricketers from Surrey